The Tangkhulic and Tangkhul languages are a group of Sino-Tibetan languages spoken mostly in northeastern Manipur, India. Conventionally classified as "Naga," they are not clearly related to other Naga languages, and (with Maringic) are conservatively classified as an independent Tangkhul–Maring branch of Tibeto-Burman, pending further research.

The Maringic languages appear to be closely related to the Tangkhulic family, but not part of it.

Languages
Tangkhulic languages include:
Tangkhul (Indian Tangkhul)
Somra (Burmese Tangkhul)
Akyaung Ari
Kachai
Huishu
Tusom
Suansu

The Tangkhulic languages are not particularly close to each other.

Brown's "Southern Tangkhul" (= Southern Luhupa?) is a Kuki-Chin rather than Tangkhulic language. It has strong links with the recently discovered Sorbung language, which is also not Tangkhulic despite being spoken by ethnic Tangkhul. some northern villages (Chingjaroi, Jessami, Soraphung Razai) in Tangkhul area have language more closely related to the Angami-pochuri language group.

Koki, Long Phuri, Makuri, and Para are "Naga" languages spoken in and around Leshi Township, Myanmar. These four languages could possibly classify as Tangkhulic languages or Ao languages.

Classification
Mortensen (2003:5) classifies the Tangkhulic languages as follows.
Tangkhulic
Northern: Huishu
North-Central: Champhung
East-Central
Eastern
Kachai
Phadāng
Central
Standard Tangkhul
Ukhrul 
Southern
Brown's 'Central Tangkhul'
South-Central
Khangoi
Brown's 'Northern Tangkhul'

Reconstruction
Proto-Tangkhulic, the reconstructed ancestral proto-language of the Tangkhulic languages, has been reconstructed by Mortensen (2012).

Mortensen (2003:5-7) lists the following phonological innovations (sound changes) from Proto-Tibeto-Burman (PTB) to Proto-Tangkhulic.
PTB *s- > *th-; PTB *ts-, *sy- > *s-
PTB *dz-, *dzy-, *tsy- > *ts-
PTB *ky-, *gy- > *ʃ-
PTB *kr-, *tsy- > *c-
Neutralization of vowel length distinctions in non-low vowels
Dissimilation of aspiration in prefixes

Proto-Tangkhulic also has the nominalizing prefix *kV-.

Proto-Tangkhulic lexical innovations are:
 *war ‘mushroom’ (found exclusively in Tangkhulic)
 *kɔ.phuŋ ‘mountain’ (found exclusively in Tangkhulic)
 *kɔ.mi ‘to give’ (found exclusively in Tangkhulic)
 *khaj ‘fish’ (also found in some Zeme and Angami languages)
 *pan ‘hand’ (also found in some Zeme languages)
 *pej ‘foot’ (also found in some Zeme and Angami languages)

References

George van Driem (2001) Languages of the Himalayas: An Ethnolinguistic Handbook of the Greater Himalayan Region. Brill.
Mortensen, David R. and James A. Miller (2013). “A reconstruction of Proto-Tangkhulic rhymes.” Linguistics of the Tibeto-Burman Area 36(1): 1-32.
Mortensen, David R. (2012). Database of Tangkhulic Languages. (unpublished ms. contributed to STEDT).
Mortensen, David R. and James A. Miller (2009). “Proto-Tangkhul Onsets in Comparative Perspective.” International Conference on Sino-Tibetan Languages and Linguistics 42, Chiangmai, November 4. 
Mortensen, David R. (2003). “Comparative Tangkhul.” Unpublished Qualifying Paper, UC Berkeley.
Mortensen, David. 2014. The Tangkhulic Tongues - How I Started Working on Endangered Languages.

 
Languages of India